Ladbrooke School is a former school in High Street, Potters Bar, England, and a grade II listed building with Historic England.

References

External links

Grade II listed buildings in Hertfordshire
Potters Bar
Former school buildings in the United Kingdom